Serixia semiusta is a species of beetle in the family Cerambycidae. It was first described by Francis Polkinghorne Pascoe in 1867, and is known to be from the Indonesian island of Sumatra.

References

Serixia
Beetles described in 1867